National Institute of Technology Agartala (NIT Agartala or NITA) is a technology-oriented institute of higher education established by India's Ministry of Human Resource Development Government of India in Agartala, India. It was founded as Tripura Engineering College in 1965 and declared a National Institute of Technology (NIT) in 2006, thus being recognized as an Institute of National Importance.

The institute was established in 1965 as Tripura Engineering College, with the branches of civil, electrical, and mechanical engineering. It was initially affiliated with Calcutta University and had the same curriculum structure and examination system as Bengal Engineering College (currently IIEST Shibpur).

After the establishment of Tripura University in 1987, the institute was affiliated with it. Courses toward a degree in computer science and engineering were offered beginning in the 1999–2000 session, and three new degrees were offered beginning in the 2005–06 session: Electrical & Electronics, Production and Transportation Engineering.

On 23 February 2006, the Union Cabinet approved the proposal of the state government for the conversion of Tripura Engineering College to the National Institute of Technology.

Campus

The institute is 4 km off National Highway (NH-44) and about 24 km away from the capital city, Agartala. The nearest Rail station is about 2 km away, at Jirania.

Facilities

 Student Activity center
Knowledge Center (library)
Computer Center
Gym (separate for boys and girls)
Sports Center
College Cafeteria
Table Tennis Room and Badminton Court
Hospital and Medical Center
Jogging Park
Night canteen
WiFi across campus
Indoor Games Center

History
The institute was converted from Tripura Engineering College, a State Engineering College, to a National Institute of Technology in 2006. To better reflect this new status, the total seats were increased from 250 to 420 for the academic session 2007 2008 and undergraduate courses were introduced in electrical and electronics engineering, transportation engineering and production engineering. The Civil Engineering Department started a postgraduate programme in structural engineering to fulfill a state requirement. The campus, which had been nonresidential, was made residential for the 2007 2008 session with the reopening of two boys' hostels and one girls' hostel. The institute is built over 365.6 acres (1.48 km2) of land.

Organization and administration

Departments

Engineering
Department of Bio Engineering
Department of Chemical Engineering
Department of Civil Engineering
Department of Computer Science and Engineering (Incorporates Dept. of MCA)
Department of Electrical Engineering
Department of Electronics and Communication Engineering
Department of Electronics and Instrumentation Engineering
Department of Mechanical Engineering
Department of Production Engineering
Engineering Physics [Dual Degree (B.Tech.+M.Tech.)]
Computational Mathematics [Dual Degree (B.Tech.+M.Tech.)] 
Sciences
Department of Chemistry
Department of Mathematics
Department of Physics
Management, Humanities & Social Sciences

Academics

Academic programs 
NIT Agartala offers nine four-year undergraduate programs in engineering. All undergraduate programs lead to a Bachelor of Technology (B.Tech.) degree. Post graduate Master's of Technology (M.Tech.) courses in bio engineering, chemical engineering, civil engineering, computer science and engineering, electrical engineering, electronic and communication engineering, mechanical engineering and production engineering are also offered. From July 2013, dual-degree courses in engineering physics and a five-year integrated course in applied physics, chemistry and mathematics were started. NITA is the second NIT in India (after National Institute of Technology Calicut), and sixth among all NIT's and IIT's (Indian Institutes of Technology), to start a program in engineering physics. The Department of Computer Science and Engineering offers a three-year degree leading to a Master's in Computer Applications (MCA) course. PhD and post-doctorate fellowships are offered by some departments. NIT Agartala also offers a CDAC program.

Admission 
Admission to the undergraduate program  is based on the rank secured in the Joint Entrance Examination (Main). Candidates must also secure at least 75% marks in the 12th class examination, or be in the top 20 percentile in the 12th class examination conducted by the respective boards. For Scheduled Castes/Scheduled Tribes students, the qualifying marks would be 65% in the 12th class examination.

The NIMCET is a Common Entrance National Level Test, conducted by any of the NITs, for admission in to their MCA program. The admission into the MCA program of NIT-A is based on the Rank obtained in NIMCET exam only.

Accreditation
In 2013, the mechanical and civil engineering branches of the institute were accredited by the National Board of Accreditation for five years, while the electrical engineering branch was provisionally accredited for two years.

Rankings

NIT Agartala was ranked 80th among engineering colleges in India by the National Institutional Ranking Framework (NIRF) in 2022.

Student life

Sports

Cultural Fest
NIT Agartala's cultural fest is known as Moksha.

Tech Fest
NIT Agartala's tech fest is known as Aayam. In the year 2023, the college will be organising its eighth edition.

Alumni
Sudip Roy Barman - MLA of Agartala Assembly constituency

Dr. Gaurav Kumar Bharti - https://scholar.google.co.in/citations?user=2duwCkUAAAAJ&hl=en

See also 
National Institutes of Technology
Education in India

References

External links
 

Engineering colleges in Tripura
National Institutes of Technology
Education in Agartala
Educational institutions established in 2006
2006 establishments in Tripura
All India Council for Technical Education